Youngstown is a village in southern Alberta, Canada within Special Area No. 3. The village refers to itself as a Sportsman's Paradise due to plenty of wild game and trout fishing in the area.

Demographics 

In the 2016 Census of Population conducted by Statistics Canada, the Village of Youngstown recorded a population of 154 living in 68 of its 88 total private dwellings, a  change from its 2011 population of 178.

See also 
List of communities in Alberta
List of villages in Alberta

References

External links 

1913 establishments in Alberta
Special Area No. 3
Villages in Alberta